APRA or Apra may refer to:

Places
Apra, Punjab, a census town city in Jalandhar District of Punjab, India
 Apra Harbor, the main port of Guam

Acronyms
 American Popular Revolutionary Alliance (Alianza Popular Revolucionaria Americana), a Peruvian political party
 Apra (foundation), an Abkhazian political organization
 APRA AMCOS, comprising the Australasian Performing Right Association and Australasian Mechanical Copyright Owners Society 
 Australian Professional Rodeo Association
 Australian Prudential Regulation Authority
 Legion of Ratu Adil, or Angkatan Perang Ratu Adil,  a pro-Dutch militia and private army established during the Indonesian National Revolution
 Pontifical Athenaeum Regina Apostolorum (Ateneo Pontificio Regina Apostolorum), a University in Rome